Ajami, in Iran, may refer to:
 Ajami, Hashtrud, East Azerbaijan Province
 Ajami, West Azerbaijan

See also
 Ajam, Iran (disambiguation)